Varberg Municipality (Varbergs kommun) is a municipality in Halland County, in southwest Sweden. Its seat is in Varberg.

It was formed in 1971 through the amalgamation of the City of Varberg and the surrounding rural municipalities. There are 25 original local government entities included in the municipality.

5,000 people are commuting out from the municipality, mainly to Gothenburg and Falkenberg. 3,200 people are commuting into Falkenberg.

Localities
There are 16 urban areas (also called a tätort or locality) in Varberg Municipality.

In the table the localities are listed according to the size of the population as of December 31, 2005. The municipal seat is in bold characters.

International relations

Twin towns — Sister cities
The municipality is twinned with:

 Karlovy Vary, Czech Republic
 Haderslev Municipality, Denmark
 Tartumaa, Estonia
 Uusikaupunki, Finland
 Sandefjord, Norway

References

External links

 
Varberg Municipality - Official site
Halland County Museum at Varberg - Official site
Coat of arms
Varberg Municipality Vacancies

 
Municipalities of Halland County